Geoffrey Noel Blake (9 April 1914 – 1991) was an English athlete who competed in the 1934 British Empire Games.

At the 1934 Empire Games he was a member of the English relay team which won the gold medal in the 4×440 yards event. In the 440 yards competition he was eliminated in the semi-finals.

External links
 Homepage and results of the Commonwealth Games
 Rootsweb

1914 births
1991 deaths
English male sprinters
Athletes (track and field) at the 1934 British Empire Games
Commonwealth Games gold medallists for England
Commonwealth Games medallists in athletics
20th-century English people
Medallists at the 1934 British Empire Games